Kerala State Institute for Children's Literature (KSICL) is an Institution under the Department of Cultural Affairs of Kerala, India. It was constituted in 1981 for publishing children's literature books and magazines. The institute published its first book in 1981 named Nambooryachanum Manthravum, by P. Narendranath. The institute also publishes a children's magazine titled Thaliru. Palliyara Sreedharan is the present director of this institute.

References

External links

Children's book publishers
Publishing companies of India
Publishing companies established in 1981
1981 establishments in Kerala